The Vyoksa is a river running in the western part of the Kostroma Oblast in Central Russia. The river originates at the outflow of Lake Galichskoye. It drains into the Kostroma in the town of Buy.

References 

Rivers of Kostroma Oblast